Matthew Zions (born 27 December 1978) is an Australian professional golfer.

Zions was born in Gosford, Australia. He grew up in the Mid North Coast region of New South Wales, where he played at the Kempsey Golf Club. His father Paul Zions is a former representative golfer. He moved to the United States and played college golf at the University of Colorado.  He also competed in inter school tennis events.  He turned professional in 2003.

Zions played on the European Tour (earning his tour card through Q-School) in 2007, the PGA Tour of Australasia and the Challenge Tour in 2008, and the Challenge Tour in 2009 and 2010. In 2010, he re-earned his European Tour card by finishing 15th on the Challenge Tour Order of Merit.

Zions played in the 2007 Open Championship, missing the cut.

Zions won the 2011 Saint-Omer Open, which gives him an exemption until the end of the 2012 European Tour season. Zions finished 124th on the European Tour money list, normally six spots outside keeping his Tour Card, but his win exempted him for the season.

Zions dropped down to the Challenge Tour for 2013, and then retired from full-time golf.  In 2014 he worked for R.K. Pinson & Associates as a petroleum landman.

Professional wins (1)

European Tour wins (1)

1Dual-ranking event with the Challenge Tour

Challenge Tour wins (1)

1Dual-ranking event with the European Tour

Results in major championships

Note: Zions only played in The Open Championship.
CUT = missed the half-way cut

See also
2006 European Tour Qualifying School graduates
2010 Challenge Tour graduates

References

External links

Australian male golfers
Colorado Buffaloes men's golfers
European Tour golfers
PGA Tour of Australasia golfers
People from Gosford
1978 births
Living people
Sportsmen from New South Wales